Neptis marci is a butterfly in the family Nymphalidae. It is found in the eastern part of the Democratic Republic of the Congo and possibly Rwanda. The habitat consists of montane forests.

References

Butterflies described in 1998
marci